Judith Margaret Gamin (18 July 1930 – 7 August 2022) was an Australian politician. She was a National Party member of the Legislative Assembly of Queensland, representing the district of South Coast from 1988 to 1989, and the district of Burleigh from 1992 to 2001.

Personal life

Gamin was the daughter of Sir George Fisher CMG, a long time chairman of Mount Isa Mines Limited and the first Chancellor of James Cook University of North Queensland, who died in 2007. Gamin was also aunt to LNP Senator for Queensland, Susan McDonald.

References

                   

1930 births
2022 deaths
Members of the Queensland Legislative Assembly
National Party of Australia members of the Parliament of Queensland
21st-century Australian politicians
21st-century Australian women politicians
Women members of the Queensland Legislative Assembly